İkinci Mayak (also, İkinci Nömräli Mayak and Vtoroy Mayak) is a village and the least populous municipality in the Neftchala Rayon of Azerbaijan.  It has a population of 361.

References 

Populated places in Neftchala District